Simon Brady Ngapandouetnbu (born 12 April 2003) is a Cameroonian professional footballer who plays as a goalkeeper for Marseille.

Career
Ngapandouetnbu is a product of the youth academies of ASPTT Marseille, ASMJ Blancarde, and Marseille. On 11 October 2019 he signed his first professional contract with Marseille for 3 years. That same year, he was promoted to their reserves and was backup keeper for the senior squad. He extended his contract with the club on 8 March 2022.

International career
Born in Cameroon, Ngapandouetnbu moved to France at a young age. He was on the radar for the Cameroon U17s for the 2019 FIFA U-17 World Cup, and other youth sides for Cameroon. In November 2021, he was controversially called up to the France U19s for 2022 UEFA European Under-19 Championship qualification matches. In September 2022, he was formally called up to the senior Cameroon national team for a set of friendlies.He was included in Cameroon squad for 2022 FIFA World Cup as third goalkeeper.

References

External links
 
 
 FFF Profile

2003 births
Living people
People from West Region (Cameroon)
Cameroonian footballers
French footballers
Cameroonian emigrants to France
Association football goalkeepers
Championnat National 2 players
Olympique de Marseille players
2022 FIFA World Cup players